Josef Kopecký (born 23 September 1892, date of death unknown) was a Czech sports shooter. He competed in the 25 m pistol event at the 1936 Summer Olympics.

References

External links
 

1892 births
Year of death missing
Czech male sport shooters
Olympic shooters of Czechoslovakia
Shooters at the 1936 Summer Olympics
Place of birth missing